A commote (Welsh cwmwd, sometimes spelt in older documents as cymwd, plural cymydau, less frequently cymydoedd) was a secular division of land in Medieval Wales. The word derives from the prefix cym- ("together", "with") and the noun bod ("home, abode"). The English word "commote" is derived from the Middle Welsh cymwt.

Medieval Welsh land organisation

The basic unit of land was the tref, a small village or settlement. In theory, 100 trefi made up a cantref (literally, "one hundred settlements"; plural: cantrefi), and half or a third of a cantref was a cymwd, although in practice the actual numbers varied greatly. Together with the cantrefi, commotes were the geographical divisions through which defence and justice were organised. In charge of a commote would be a chieftain probably related to the ruling Prince of the Kingdom. His court would have been situated in a special tref, referred to as a maerdref. Here, the bonded villagers who farmed the chieftain's estate lived, together with the court officials and servants. Commotes were further divided into maenorau or maenolydd.

Commotes in the Domesday Book

The Domesday Book has entries for those commotes that in 1086 were under Norman control, but still subject to Welsh law and custom. However, it refers to them using the Anglo-Norman word "commot" instead of hundred, the word used at the time for the equivalent land division in England. The commotes mentioned in the Domesday Book, in general, represented recent Anglo-Norman advances into Welsh territory. Although the commotes were assessed for military service and taxation, their obligations were rated in carucates (derived from Latin for cattle or oxen), not in hides as on the English side of the border.

The customs of the commotes are described in the Domesday accounts of the border earldoms of Gloucestershire, Herefordshire, Shropshire and Cheshire. The principal commotes described in Domesday were Archenfield, Ewias, and the commotes of Gwent in the south; Cynllaith, Edeirnion, and Iâl (Shropshire accounts); and Englefield, Rhos and Rhufoniog (Cheshire accounts).

History
In legal usage, the English word 'commote' replaced cwmwd following the Edwardian conquest of Wales in the 13th century, when English was made the official language for all legal documents. The Welsh, most of whom knew not a word of English, naturally continued to use cwmwd and still do so today. In much of Wales, commotes had become more important than cantrefi by the mid-13th century and administration of Welsh law became the responsibility of the commote court rather than the cantref court. Owain Glyndŵr called representatives from the commotes for his two parliaments during the rising of 1400–1409.

The boundaries of commotes, or in some cases cantrefi, were in many cases subsequently more accurately represented by church rural deaneries than by the hundreds issuing from the 16th century Acts of Union.

Is and Uwch in commote names
A considerable number of the names of adjacent medieval Welsh commotes contain is (meaning "lower", or "below" as a preposition) and uwch (originally uch and meaning "higher", or "above" as a preposition), with the dividing line between them being a natural boundary, such as a river, mountain or forest. Melville Richards noted that, in almost every instance where this occurs, the point of central authority was in the "is division" when the commote was named, and he suggested that such commotes were originally named in the sense of 'nearer' and 'farther' based on the location of that central authority—i.e., the terminology is for administrative purposes and not a geographical characterisation.

Richards attributed the use of is and uwch to some confusion in translating Latin sub (meaning "lower") and supra (meaning "upper") into Welsh in too literal a sense, when the proper sense was to consider sub to be an administrative synonym for Latin cis (meaning "this side of"), and to consider supra to be an administrative synonym for Latin trans (meaning "the other side of").

A number of smaller units, such as manors, parishes and townships, also use the administrative distinction of is and uwch, sometimes in their Latin forms (e.g., the manor of Clydach in Uwch Nyfer, divided into Sub Clydach and Ultra (Supra) Clydach).

This is unrelated to the common use of isaf and uchaf in farm names, where the terms are used in the geographical sense.

List of commotes, organised by cantref
The Red Book of Hergest (1375–1425) provides a detailed list of commotes in the late 14th and early 15th centuries. The list has some overlaps and is ambiguous in parts, especially in the Gwynedd section. It should also be borne in mind that the number and organisation of the commotes was different in the earlier Middle Ages; some of the units and divisions listed here are late creations. The original orthography of the manuscript is given here together with the standard modern Welsh equivalents.

Gwynedd
Cantref Tegigyl (Cantref Tegeingl):
Kymwt Insel (Cwmwd Insel)
Kymwt Prestan (Cwmwd Prestatyn)
Kymwt Rudlan (Cwmwd Rhuddlan)
Cantref Dyffryn Clwyt (Cantref Dyffryn Clwyd):
Kymwt Colyan (Cwmwd Colian)
Kymwt Llannerch (Cwmwd Llannerch)
Kymwt Ystrat (Cwmwd Ystrad)
Cantref Rywynyawc (Cantref Rhufoniog)
Kymwt Rhuthyn (Cwmwd Rhuthyn)
Kymwt Uch Alech (Cwmwd Uwch Aled)
Kymwt Is Alech (Cwmwd Is Aled)
Cantref Rhos
Kymwt Uch Dulas (Cwmwd Uwch Dulas)
Kymwt Is Dulas (Cwmwd Is Dulas)
Kymwt Y kreudyn (Cwmwd Creuddyn)
Cantrefoed Mon (Anglesey) – Aberffraw, Cemais, Rhosyr
Kymwt Llan Uaes (Cwmwd Llanfaes, properly called Dindaethwy)
Kymwt Kemeis (Cwmwd Cemais)
Kymwt Talebolyon (Cwmwd Talebolyon)
Kymwt Aberffraw (Cwmwd Aberffraw)
Kymwt Penn Rhos (Cwmwd Penrhos)
Kymwt Rosvyrr (Cwmwd Rhosyr)
Cantref Arllechwed (Cantref Arllechwedd)
Kymwt Treffryw (Cwmwd Trefriw)
Kymwt Aber (Cwmwd Aber)
Cantref Aruon (Cantref Arfon)
Kymwt Uch Konwy (Cwmwd Uwch Conwy)
Kymwt Is Conwy (Cwmwd Is Conwy)
Cantref Dinodyn
Kymwt Rifnot
Kymwt Ardudwy (Cwmwd Ardudwy)
Cantref Llyyn (Cantref Llŷn)
Kymwt Dinmael (Cwmwd Dinmael)
Kymwt is Clogyon (Cwmwd Is Clogion
Kymwt Cwmdinam (Cwmwd Cwm Dinam)
Cantref Meiryonyd (Cantref Meirionnydd)
Kymwt Eftumaneyr (Cwmwd Ystumaner)
Kymwt Talybont (Cwmwd Tal-y-bont)
Cantref Eryri
Kymwt Cyueilawc (Cwmwd Cyfeiliog)
Kymwt Madeu
Kymwt Uch Meloch
Kymwt Is Meloch
Kymwt Llan Gonwy (Cwmwd Llangonwy)
Kymwt Dinmael (Cwmwd Dinmael)
Kymwt Glyndyudwy (Cwmwd Glyndyfrdwy)

Powys
Cantrefoed Powys Madawc
Kymwt Iaal (Cwmwd Iâl, later "Yale")
Kymwt Ystrad Alun
Kymwt Yr Hop (Cwmwd Yr Hob, later "Hope")
Kymwt Berford
Kymwt Wnknan
Kymwt Trefwenn
Kymwt Croesosswallt
Kymwt y Creudyn
Kymwt Nant Odyn
Kymwt Ceuenbleid (possibly Cwmwd Cynllaith)
Kymwt Is Raeadyr (Cwmwd Mochnant Is Rhaiadr)
Cantrefoed Powys Gwennwynwyn
Kymwt Uch Raeadyr (Cwmwd Mochnant Uwch Rhaiadr)
Kymwt Deu Dyswr (Cwmwd Deuddwr in cantref Ystlyg)
Kymwt Llannerchwdwl (Cwmwd Llanerch Hudol in cantref Ystlyg)
Kymwt Ystrad Marchell (in cantref Ystlyg)
Kymwt Mecheyn (Cwmwd Mechain Is Coed and Cwmwd Mechain Uwch Coed)
Kymwt Caer Einon (Caereinion)
Kymwt Uch Affes
Kymwt Is Affes
Kymwt Uch Coet (Cwmwd Uwch Coed in cantref Arwystli)
Kymwt Is Coet (Cwmwd Is Coed in cantref Arwystli)

Maelienydd
Cantrefoed Maelenyd
Kymwt Ceri
Kymwt Gwerthrynnyon
Kymwt Swyd Uudugre
Kymwt Swyd Yethon

Kymwt Llwythyfnwc

Buellt
Cantref Buellt
Kymwt Penn Buellt (Cwmwd Pen Buellt)
Kymwt Swydman (Cwmwd Swyddfan(?) : Cwmwd Dinan)
Kymwt Treflys (Cwmwd Treflys)
Kymwt Is Iruon (Cwmwd Is Irfon)

Elfael
Cantref Eluael (Cantref Elfael)
Kymwt Uch Mynyd (Cwmwd Uwch Mynydd)
Kymwt Is Mynyd (Cwmwd Is Mynyd)

Brecheinawc (Brycheiniog)
Cantref Selyf
Kymwt Brwynllys (Cwmwd Brwynllys)
Kymwt Talgarth (Cwmwd Talgarth)
Cantref Tewdos
Kymwt Dyffryn Hodni (Cwmwd Dyffryn Hoddni)
Kymwt Llywel (Cwmwd Llys Hywel)
Kymwt Tir Rawlf (Cwmwd Tir Rawlff)
Cantref Ida
Kymwt Ystrat Yw (Cwmwd Ystrad Yw)
Kymwt Cruc Howel (Cwmwd Crughywel)
Kymwt Evyas (Cwmwd Euyas)

Ystrad Tywi
Cantref Bychan
Kymwt Hirvryn
Kymwt Perued
Kymwt Iskennen
Cantref Eginawc (Eginog)
Kymwt Kedweli (Cydweli)
Kymwt Carnywyllawn (Carnwyllion or Carnwyllon)
Kymwt Gwhyr (Gŵyr now Swansea)
Cantref Mawr
Kymwt Mallaen
Kymwt Caeaw
Kymwt Maenawr Deilaw
Kymwt Cetheinawc
Kymwt Mab Eluyw
Kymwt Mab Utryt
Kymwt Widigada

Ceredigyawn (Ceredigion)
Cantref Penweddig
Kymwt Geneurglyn (Cwmwd Genau'r Glyn)
Kymwt Perued (Cwmwd Perfedd)
Kymwt Creudyn (Cwmwd Creuddyn)
Cantref Mabwynyon (Cantref Mabwnion)
Kymwt Meuenyd (Cwmwd Mefenydd)
Kymwt Anhunyawc (Cwmwd Anhuniog)
Kymwt Pennard (Cwmwd Penardd)
Cantref Caer Wedros (Cantref Caerwedros)
Kymwt Wenyionid (Cwmwd Gwinionydd)
Kymwt Is Coed (Cwmwd Is Coed)

Dyfed
Cantref Cemeis (Cemais)
Kymwt Is Neuer (Cemais Is Nyfer)
Kymwt Uch Neuer (Cemais Uwch Nyfer)
Cantref Deugledyf (Daugleddyf)
Kymwt Castel Hu (Castell Gwis)
Kymwt Llan y Hadein (Llanhuadain)
Cantref Emlyn
Kymwt Is Cuch (Emlyn Is Cuch)
Kymwt Uch Cuch (Emlyn Uwch Cuch)
Cantref Wartha (Gwarthaf)
Kymwt Amgoet (Amgoed)
Kymwt Derllys (Derllys)
Kymwt y Uelfre (Efelfre)
Kymwt Eluyd (Elfed)
Kymwt Pennryn (Penrhyn)
Kymwt Peluneawc (Peuliniog)
Kymwt Talacharn (Talacharn)
Kymwt Estyrlwyf (Ystlwys)
Cantref Pebideawc (Pebidiog)
Kymwt Menew (Mynyw)
Kymwt Penncaer (Pencaer)
Cantref Pennbrwc (Penfro)
Coedrath
Penfro
Cantref Rhos (Rhos)
Kymwt Castell Gwalchmei (Castell Gwalchmei)
Kymwt Hawlfford (Hwlffordd)

Morgannwg
Cantref Gorvynyd
Kymwt Rwng Net A Thawy
Kymwt Tir Yr Hwndryt
Kymwt Rwng Neth ac Avyn
Kymwt Tir Yr Iarll
Kymwt Y Coety
Kymwt Maenawr Glyn Ogwr
Cantref Penn Ychen
Kymwt Meisgyn
Kymwt Glyn Rodne
Kymwt Maenawr Tal y Vann
Kymwt Maenawr Ruthyn
Cantref Breinyawl
Kymwt Is Caech
Kymwt Uch Caech
Kymwt Kibwr (Ceibwr; later Kibbor)
Cantref Gwynllwc
Kymwt Yr Heid
Kymwt Ydref Berued
Kymwt Edelygyon
Kymwt Eithyaf
Kymwt Y Mynyd
Cantref Gwent
Kymwt Is Coed
Kymwt Llemynyd
Kymwt Tref y Gruc
Kymwt Uch Coed

Citations

References

External links
 — discussions of the terms 'cantref' and 'commote', with maps.
 — discusses (but does not give a pure list) the cantrefi known to him, with passing references to several of the cymydau.

 01
Former subdivisions of Wales
Medieval Wales
 01